Claus-Christian Carbon (born 23 March 1971 in Schweinfurt, West Germany) is a full professor of psychology at the Department of General Psychology and Methodology, Institute of Psychology of the University of Bamberg, in Germany. He is currently head of the Department of General Psychology and Methodology and head of EPÆG—an international research group.

Career
He received his diplom degree in psychology in 1998 from the University of Trier, his magister degree in philosophy in 1999 from the University of Trier, his PhD in psychology in 2003 from Freie Universität Berlin and his habilitation in psychology in 2006 from University of Vienna. His research is mainly focused on empirical aesthetics, face processing, consumer research, haptic processing, cognitive maps, scientometrics and conspiracy theories.

Further activities
Carbon is editor-in-chief of the scientific journal Art & Perception and section editor of Perception and iPerception, a Consulting Editor of Musicae Scientiae and an Action Editor of Frontiers in Perception and of Frontiers in Neuroscience. As member of the Editorial Board he serves for the scientific journals Advances in Cognitive Psychology. and for Open Psychology. He is a full member of the Deutsche Gesellschaft für Psychologie (DGPs; German Society for Psychology) and the Psychonomic Society. In 2013 he founded the Bamberg Graduate School of Affective and Cognitive Sciences (BaGrACS)—he is currently head of this Graduate School; BaGrACS focuses on the link between affective and cognitive processing.

Selected publications
 Carbon, C. C., & Jakesch, M. (2013). A model for haptic aesthetic processing and its implications for design. Proceedings of the IEEE, 101(9), 1–11. {IF=6.810}
 Carbon, C. C., & Ditye, T. (2011). Sustained effects of adaptation on the perception of familiar faces. Journal of Experimental Psychology: Human Perception & Performance, 37(3), 615–625. {IF=2.947}
 Carbon, C. C. (2010). The cycle of preference: Long‐term dynamics of aesthetic appreciation. Acta Psychologica, 134(2), 233‐244. {IF=2.155}
 Carbon, C.C. (2010). The Earth is flat when personally significant experiences with the sphericity of the Earth are absent. Cognition, 116(1), 130–135. {IF=3.481}
 Grüter, T., & Carbon, C. C. (2010). Escaping attention. Some cognitive disorders can be overlooked. Science, 328(5977), 435‐436. {IF=28.103}

References

External links
 Homepage of the Department of General Psychology and Methodology
 Homepage of Experimental-Psychology
 Homepage of EPAEG
 Homepage of the German Society for Psychology

Living people
German philosophers
1971 births
German psychologists
Cognitive psychologists